St. Lawrence County is a county in the U.S. state of New York. As of the 2020 census, the population was 108,505. The county seat is Canton.
The county is named for the Saint Lawrence River, which in turn was named for the Christian saint Lawrence of Rome, on whose feast day the river was visited by French explorer Jacques Cartier.

St. Lawrence County comprises the Ogdensburg-Massena, NY Micropolitan Statistical Area and is New York's largest county by area.

History 

When counties were established in the Province of New York in 1683, the present St. Lawrence County was part of Albany County. This was an enormous territory, including the northern part of New York State as well as all of the present State of Vermont and, in theory, extending westward to the Pacific Ocean. The county was reduced in size on July 3, 1766, by the creation of Cumberland County, and further on March 16, 1770, by the creation of Gloucester County, both containing territory now in Vermont.

On March 12, 1772, what was left of Albany County was split into three parts, one remaining under the name Albany County. The other two were called Tryon County (later renamed Montgomery County) and Charlotte County (later renamed Washington County). Tryon County contained the western portion (and, since no western boundary was specified, theoretically extended west to the Pacific). The eastern boundary of Tryon County was approximately five miles west of the present city of Schenectady, and the county included the western part of the Adirondack Mountains and the area west of the West Branch of the Delaware River. The area then designated as Tryon County includes what are now 37 counties of New York State. The county was named for William Tryon, colonial governor of New York. Charlotte County contained the eastern portion of Albany County.

In 1784, following the peace treaty that ended the American Revolutionary War, the name "Charlotte County" was changed to Washington County to honor George Washington, the American Revolutionary War general and later President of the United States of America.  Tryon County was changed to Montgomery County to honor the general, Richard Montgomery, who had captured several places in Canada and died trying to capture the city of Quebec; it replaced the name of the hated British governor.

In 1788, Clinton County was split off from Washington County. This was a much larger area than the present Clinton County, including part of what would later become St. Lawrence County, as well as several other counties or county parts of the present New York State.

In 1789, the size of Montgomery County was reduced by the splitting off of Ontario County from Montgomery. The actual area split off from Montgomery County was much larger than the present county, also including the present Allegany, Cattaraugus, Chautauqua, Erie, Genesee, Livingston, Monroe, Niagara, Orleans, Steuben, Wyoming, Yates, and part of Schuyler and Wayne Counties.

St. Lawrence County is part of Macomb's Purchase of 1791.

In 1791, Herkimer County was one of three counties split off from Montgomery (the other two being Otsego, and Tioga County). This was much larger than the present county, however, and was reduced by a number of subsequent splits. The first was the splitting off in 1794 of Onondaga County. This county was larger than the current Onondaga County, including the present Cayuga, Cortland, and part of Oswego Counties. This was followed by the splitting off in 1798 from Herkimer County of two portions: one, Oneida County, was larger than the current Oneida County, including the present Jefferson, Lewis, and part of Oswego Counties; another portion, together with a portion of Tioga County, was taken to form Chenango County.

In 1799, Clinton County was reduced in size by the splitting off of Essex County from Clinton County.

In 1802, parts of Clinton, Herkimer, and Montgomery Counties were taken to form the new St. Lawrence County.  At that time Ogdensburg was the county seat.  In 1828 the county seat was moved to Canton. The selection of Canton as the county seat was a compromise by the state legislature to end competition between factions supporting Ogdensburg and Potsdam for the county seat.

Earthquake
On September 5, 1944, a 5.8magnitude earthquake centered in Massena struck the county.  The earthquake was felt from Canada to Maryland, and from Maine to Indiana. The earthquake was the strongest earthquake in New York State history.

Geography
It is the largest county by area in New York. It is larger than the entire state of Rhode Island (1544.9 square miles) and the state of Delaware (2488.72 square miles). St. Lawrence County is part of the North Country region.

Part of the county is in the Adirondack Park and includes much of the Oswegatchie River, Cranberry Lake and Lake Ozonia.

The Port of Ogdensburg in St. Lawrence County is the only U.S. port on the St. Lawrence Seaway, which allows ships and vessels to pass through the St. Lawrence River and on to the Great Lakes. Ogdensburg Harbor Light is listed in the National Register of Historic Places, and in the National Register of Historic Places listings in St. Lawrence County, New York

Adjacent counties
 Stormont, Dundas and Glengarry United Counties, Ontario, Canada – north
 Leeds and Grenville United Counties, Ontario, Canada – northwest
 Franklin County – east
 Herkimer County – south
 Hamilton County – south
 Lewis County – southwest
 Jefferson County – west

Demographics

As of the census of 2000, there were 113,931 people, 40,506 households, and 26,936 families residing in the county. The racial makeup of the county was 94.51% White, 2.38% African American, 0.87% Native American, 0.71% Asian, 0.03% Pacific Islander, 0.69% from other races, and 0.51% from two or more races. Hispanic or Latino of any race were 1.79% of the population. 16.9% were of French, 16.1% Irish, 13.9% American, 11.6% English, 8.1% French Canadian, 7.9% German and 7.6% Italian ancestry according to Census 2000. 95.6% spoke only English, while 3.2% spoke French and 1.2% Spanish at home.

There were 40,506 households, out of which 31.80% had children under the age of 18 living with them, 51.50% were married couples living together, 10.30% had a female householder with no husband present, and 33.50% were non-families. 26.50% of all households were made up of individuals, and 11.20% had someone living alone who was 65 years of age or older.  The average household size was 2.49 and the average family size was 2.99.

In the county, the population was spread out, with 23.40% under the age of 18, 13.80% from 18 to 24, 27.40% from 25 to 44, 22.40% from 45 to 64, and 13.00% who were 65 years of age or older.  The median age was 35 years. For every 100 females there were 103.30 males.  For every 100 females age 18 and over, there were 102.10 males.

The median income for a household in the county was $30,356, and the median income for a family was $34,510. Males had a median income of $30,135 versus $24,253 for females. The per capita income for the county was $14,728.  About 12.30% of families and 19.90% of the population were below the poverty line, including 21.30% of those under age 18 and 10.30% of those age 65 or over.

2020 Census

Education

School districts
There are 17 school districts centered in St. Lawrence County, all under the jurisdiction of the St. Lawrence-Lewis BOCES Supervisory District along with Harrisville Central School District in Lewis County, New York.
 Brasher Falls Central School District: St. Lawrence Central School, Brasher Falls
 Canton Central School District: Hugh Williams Senior High School, Canton
 Clifton-Fine Central School District: Clifton-Fine Central School, Star Lake
 Colton-Pierrepont Central School District: Colton-Pierrepont Central School, Colton
 Edwards-Knox Central School District: Edwards-Knox Central School, Russell
 Gouverneur Central School District: Gouverneur Junior/Senior High School, Gouverneur
 Hammond Central School District: Hammond Central School, Hammond
 Hermon-Dekalb Central School District: Hermon-Dekalb Central School, Dekalb Junction
 Heuvelton Central School District: Heuvelton Central School, Heuvelton
 Lisbon Central School District: Lisbon Central School, Lisbon
 Madrid-Waddington Central School District: Madrid-Waddington Central School, Madrid
 Massena Central School District: Massena Senior High School, Massena
 Morristown Central School District: Morristown Central School, Morristown
 Norwood-Norfolk Central School District: Norwood-Norfolk Central School, Norfolk
 Ogdensburg City School District: Ogdensburg Free Academy, Ogdensburg
 Parishville-Hopkinton Central School District: Parishville-Hopkinton Central School, Parishville
 Potsdam Central School District: Potsdam High School, Potsdam

All public high schools in St. Lawrence County compete in the New York State Public High School Athletic Association Section X Northern Athletic Conference.

Universities and colleges
Saint Lawrence County is home to St. Lawrence University, State University of New York at Potsdam, Clarkson University, the SUNY-ESF Ranger School, and the State University of New York at Canton.

Politics

|}

Prior to the 1992 presidential election, St. Lawrence County was a traditionally Republican county, supporting the Democrats only in their sweep of New York State counties in 1964. From 1992 through the 2012 election, St. Lawrence County swung Democratic, posting double-digit victories for Democratic candidates, most notably in 1996 when Bill Clinton won the county by 28-point margin over Bob Dole. The first Republican victory in the county since 1988 came in 2016 when Donald Trump carried the county by an eight-point margin. In 2020, it was one of only a few counties in Upstate New York where Trump improved his margin, this time carrying it by over 10 points.

Media

Radio
 1340 WMSA, Massena
 WVLF-FM Mix 96.1
 WRCD-FM 101.5 The Fox
 WSNN (99.3, Potsdam)
 WPDM (1470, Potsdam)
 WSLU (89.5, Canton)

Transportation

Airports
The following public use airports are located in the county:
 Massena International Airport (MSS) – Massena
 Ogdensburg International Airport (OGS) – Ogdensburg
 Potsdam Municipal Airport (PTD) – Potsdam
 Moores Airport (1E8) – Degrasse

Communities

Larger settlements

† - County Seat

‡ - Not Wholly in this County

Towns

 Brasher
 Canton
 Clare
 Clifton
 Colton
 De Kalb
 De Peyster
 Edwards
 Fine
 Fowler
 Gouverneur
 Hammond
 Hermon
 Hopkinton
 Lawrence
 Lisbon
 Louisville
 Macomb
 Madrid
 Massena
 Morristown
 Norfolk
 Oswegatchie
 Parishville
 Piercefield
 Pierrepont
 Pitcairn
 Potsdam
 Rossie
 Russell
 Stockholm
 Waddington

Hamlets

 Conifer
 Crary Mills
 Helena
 Massena Center
 Morley
 Newton Falls
 Pyrites
 Rooseveltown
 South Colton
 Wanakena
 Chase Mills

See also

 List of counties in New York
 National Register of Historic Places listings in St. Lawrence County, New York
 St. Lawrence County Public Transportation

References

External links
  St. Lawrence County webpage 
 St. Lawrence County History pages

Further reading
 

 
Saint Lawrence County, New York
Populated places established in 1802